Billy Jenkins may refer to:

 Billy Jenkins (rugby union) (1885-1956), Welsh international forward, played club rugby for Swansea
 Billy Jenkins (musician) (born 1956), English blues guitarist, composer, and bandleader
 Billy Jenkins (American football) (born 1974), American football defensive back
 Billy Jenkins (Australian footballer) (born 1914), Australian rules footballer
 Billy Jenkins (British Actor) (born 2007), British Actor

See also 
 Bill Jenkins (disambiguation)
 William Jenkins (disambiguation)